Bukit Beruntung is a town in Hulu Selangor District, Selangor, Malaysia. It is roughly equidistant from the town of Serendah and Batang Kali. This town, along with the neighboring Bukit Sentosa, was a planned city originally developed by Talam Corporation Berhad and is home to the Bukit Beruntung Golf & Country Club.

Infrastructure
It is accessible via a Bukit Beruntung Interchange 118 of the PLUS Expressway , as well as the Federal Route 3208 Jalan Bukit Beruntung trunk road from Sg. Choh (after the JKR Hulu Selangor border sign and the Petronas station) and a shortcut road from Rasa.

In terms of public transportation, the closest rail stations are  KTM Serendah and  KTM Batang Kali.

Industrial Area
In recent years, various corporations have opened factories, warehouses, and manufacturing sites in the Bukit Beruntung industrial area.

Perodua Manufacturing Sdn Bhd
Perodua Engine Manufacturing Sdn Bhd
Perodua Global Manufacturing Sdn Bhd
Perodua Daihatsu Kawamura-Kako Manufacturing (PDKM) Sdn Bhd
Givi Asia Sdn Bhd (Safety Equipment & Clothing)
Fuji Seats (M) Sdn Bhd (Transportation Equipment)
APM Automotive Holding Berhad
Apm Plastics Sdn Bhd
INGRESS TECHNOLOGIES SDN. BHD
Riverstone Resources Sdn Bhd
Tanjong Express (M) Sdn Bhd

Residential area
Taman Semarak
Taman Tanjung 
Taman Seroja
Apartment Seri Kembangan
Apartment Seri Tanjung
Apartment Seri Seroja
Apartment Seri Trompet
Apartment Seri Lili
Apartment Sri Semarak
Taman Melor
Taman Inai
Apartment Melur
Taman Bunga Raya
Taman Adenium
Apartment Kenanga
Apartment Teratai
Apartment Dahlia
Apartment Kemuning
Apartment Anggerik
Apartment Mawar
Taman Kasturi
Prima Beruntung
Apartment Mawar
Apartment Anggerik

Facilities
Post office
Clinic (Klinik Komuniti)
Police station
Religious Elementary School
Fire and Rescue station

Features
It is accessible and it is a community that works together in ensuring the safety of its surroundings and the environment. There is a TESCO warehouse, a golf and country club, a main local supermarket, gas stations, clinics, elementary schools, secondary schools and a Public Bank branch. It has the main mosque as well as other places of worship for other community members. Local stores and a wet market are an important part of this community as well. It is a developing community as there is a lot of lands left unowned.

Education
Sekolah Kebangsaan Bukit Sentosa 
Sekolah Kebangsaan Bukit Beruntung  
Sekolah Kebangsaan Bukit Beruntung 2
Sekolah Rendah Islam Integrasi Al-Amin Bukit Beruntung
Sekolah Jenis Kebangsaan (T) Bukit Beruntung
Sekolah Jenis Kebangsaan (C) Bukit Tangga
Sekolah Menengah Kebangsaan Bukit Sentosa
Sekolah Menengah Kebangsaan Bukit Sentosa 2
Sekolah Kebangsaan Taman Bunga Raya (1)
Sekolah Kebangsaan Taman Bunga Raya (2)

Higher Education
Septronic Skills Training College, Bukit Beruntung -- http://www.septronic.edu.my/

See also
Bukit Sentosa
Batang Kali
Rasa
Kuala Kubu Bharu
Sg. Choh
Rawang
Serendah

References

Hulu Selangor District
Townships in Selangor